Journey Cake, Ho! is a 1953 picture book written by Ruth Sawyer and illustrated by Robert McCloskey. The book tells the story of a boy who chases a journey cake around a farm. The book was a recipient of a 1954 Caldecott Honor for its illustrations.

References

1953 children's books
American picture books
Caldecott Honor-winning works